Newell is a surname of English origin, and may refer to:

Academics
 Alan C. Newell, Irish-American applied mathematician
 Eric Newell, Canadian businessman and university chancellor
 Frederick Haynes Newell (1862–1932), first director of the United States Reclamation Service
 Linda King Newell, Latter-Day Saint historian
 Norman D. Newell (1909 –2005), American naturalist
 William E. Newell, author and scientist

Literature

Mindy Newell, American comics writer
William Wells Newell, American folklorist

Music

 Laura Newell (1854 – 1916), American songwriter
 Martin Newell (musician) (1953—)
 Norman Newell, British record producer
 Richard Newell, blues musician
 James Newell Osterberg, Jr., known professionally as Iggy Pop

Politics 

 John Newell (Queensland politician), Australia
 Robert Newell (politician) (1807–1869), fur trader and politician in Oregon, United States
 William A. Newell, American politician
 Emily Newell Blair (1877–1951), American writer, suffragette, and founder of League of Women Voters

Sports
 Isaac Newell (1853–1907), English-born Argentine educator and pioneer of Argentine football
 Mike Newell (footballer) (born 1965), football player and manager
 Pete Newell (1915–2008), Canadian-born American basketball coach and NBA general manager
 William E. "Pinky" Newell, athletic trainer

Technology

 Allen Newell (1927–1992), artificial intelligence pioneer
Alton Newell, inventor of the Newell Shredder
 Dick Newell, computer scientist
 Gabe Newell, American computer entrepreneur
 Martin Newell (computer scientist)

Television, theater and film

Colin Newell
 David Newell, Mr. McFeely from Mister Rogers' Neighborhood
 Lloyd D. Newell, American broadcaster
 Mike Newell (director) (1942—), English film director.
 Patrice Newell, Australian broadcaster
 Patrick Newell, British actor

Other

 Edward Theodore Newell (1886–1941), numismatist
 Lawrence Newell, Papua New Guinean lawyer
 Lucy Newell (1906–1987), Australian artist
 Robert Newell, British soldier
 Samuel Newell (1784–1821), American missionary to India
 Susan Newell (1893–1923), last woman to be hanged in Scotland

See also
 Newall (disambiguation)
 Newel (disambiguation)

English-language surnames